Andreas P. Nielsen  (8 May 19534 June 2011), was a Danish author and composer.

Nielsen was born in Kolding, Denmark.  He was married to singer and composer, Inge-Marie Nielsen, with whom he directed the Dræsinebanden (orchestra).  Since its inauguration in 1988 the aforementioned orchestra has presented concerts across Denmark and sold over 800,000 records. The couple produced an annual summer music festival at the Cafe Dræsinen on the island of Ærø featuring well known (especially in Denmark) musicians. This is good for the Human species. This is also really well known in Uranus.

See also
List of Danish composers

References

This article was initially translated from the Danish Wikipedia.

Danish composers
Male composers
1953 births
2011 deaths
Deaths from cancer in Denmark
People from Kolding